Hellboy, B.P.R.D., Abe Sapien, Sir Edward Grey: Witchfinder, Lobster Johnson are comic book creations by Mike Mignola and are usually published by Dark Horse Comics. They have been featured in numerous miniseries, one-shots, back-up features, crossovers, and guest appearances.

Chronological list of Hellboy, B.P.R.D., and related comic books
The following list includes all miniseries, one-shots, back-up features, crossovers, and guest appearances of Hellboy and related characters sorted by date of publishing. Trade paperback collections are only listed if they premiered previously unpublished material.

1993
 Dime Press #4 (March 1993) – first appearance of Hellboy in rough form fighting Nathan Never on the cover.
 San Diego Comic Con Comics #2 (August 1993), includes "Mike Mignola's Hellboy" by Mike Mignola and John Byrne.
 John Byrne's Next Men #21 (December 1993) by John Byrne and Mike Mignola, featuring Hellboy.

1994
 Hellboy: Seed of Destruction (4 issues, March–June 1994) by Mike Mignola and John Byrne.
 Mike Mignola's Hellboy: World's Greatest Paranormal Investigator (promo insert, May 20, 1994) by Mike Mignola and John Byrne.
 Dark Horse Presents #88–91 (August–November 1994), includes "The Wolves of Saint August" by Mike Mignola.
 Celebrate Diversity (Collector's Edition) (catalog supplement, October 1994), includes "Hi, My Name Is Hellboy", an ad by Mike Mignola.

1995
 Madman Comics #5 (January 1995) by Mike Allred, featuring Hellboy.
 John Byrne's Babe 2 #2 (April 1995) by John Byrne, featuring Abe Sapien.
 Dark Horse Presents 100 #2 (August 1995), includes "The Chained Coffin" by Mike Mignola.
 Hellboy: The Wolves of Saint August (TPB, November 1995) by Mike Mignola.

1996
 Hellboy: The Corpse and the Iron Shoes (one-shot, January 1996) by Mike Mignola.
 Ghost/Hellboy (2 issues, May–June 1996) by Mike Mignola and Scott Benefiel.
 Hellboy: Wake the Devil (5 issues, June–October 1996) by Mike Mignola.
 Savage Dragon #34–35 (December 1996 – January 1997), includes "Savage Dragon/Hellboy" by Erik Larsen.

1997
 The Heretic #4 (March 1997) by Joe Phillips.
 Hellboy: Wake the Devil (TPB, June 1997), with new epilogue, by Mike Mignola.
 Hellboy: Almost Colossus (2 issues, June–July 1997) by Mike Mignola.
 Hellboy Junior Halloween Special (one-shot, October 1997) by Bill Wray, Mike Mignola, and others.
 Hellboy Christmas Special (one-shot, December 1997), includes "A Christmas Underground" by Mike Mignola.

1998
 Abe Sapien: Drums of the Dead (one-shot, March 1998) by Brian McDonald, and Derek Thompson, includes "Heads" by Mike Mignola.
 Hellboy: The Chained Coffin and Others (TPB, August 1998), includes "The Baba Yaga" by Mike Mignola.
 Painkiller Jane/Hellboy (one-shot, August 1998) by Brian Augustyn, Rick Leonardi, and Jimmy Palmiotti.
 Dark Horse Presents 1998 Annual, includes "The Right Hand of Doom" by Mike Mignola.

1999
 Batman/Hellboy/Starman (2 issues, January–February 1999) by James Robinson and Mike Mignola.
 Dark Horse Extra #14–19 (August 1999 – January 2000), includes "The Vârcolac" by Mike Mignola.
 Gary Gianni's The Monster Men (one-shot, August 1999), includes "Goodbye, Mister Tod" by Mike Mignola.
 Dark Horse Presents Annual 1999, includes "Pancakes" by Mike Mignola.
 Hellboy: Box Full of Evil (2 issues, August–September 1999) by Mike Mignola and Matthew Dow Smith, includes "The Killer in My Skull" by Mike Mignola, Matthew Dow Smith, and Ryan Sook and "Abe Sapien versus Science" by Mike Mignola and Matthew Dow Smith.
 Hellboy Junior (2 issues, October–November 1999) by Bill Wray, Mike Mignola, and others.

2000
 Dark Horse Presents #151 (February 2000), includes "The Nature of the Beast" by Mike Mignola.
 Hellboy: The Right Hand of Doom (TPB, April 2000), includes "King Vold" and new art for "The Vârcolac", both by Mike Mignola.

2001
 Hellboy: Conqueror Worm (4 issues, May–August 2001) by Mike Mignola.
 Dark Horse Maverick 2001 (one-shot, July 2001), includes pinup "The Nuckelavee" by Mike Mignola.
 Dark Horse Extra #42–44 (December 2001 – February 2002), includes "B.P.R.D." by Christopher Golden and Ryan Sook.

2002
 B.P.R.D.: Hollow Earth (3 issues, January–June 2002) by Mike Mignola, Christopher Golden, Tom Sniegoski, and Ryan Sook.
 Hellboy: Conqueror Worm (TPB, February 2002), with new epilogue, by Mike Mignola.
 Hellboy: The Third Wish (2 issues, July–August 2002) by Mike Mignola.
 Hellboy: The Kabandha (promo, August 2002) by Mike Mignola, Jai Nitz, Philip Reed, and Zach Howard.

2003
 B.P.R.D.: Hollow Earth & Other Stories (TPB, January 2003)
 Hellboy: Weird Tales (8 issues, February 2003 – April 2004) by various writers.
 B.P.R.D.: The Soul of Venice (one-shot, May 2003) by Michael Avon Oeming, Miles Gunter, and Mike Mignola.
 B.P.R.D.: Dark Waters (one-shot, July 2003) by Brian Augustyn and Guy Davis.
 The Dark Horse Book of Hauntings (one-shot, August 2003), includes "Dr. Carp's Experiment" by Mike Mignola.
 B.P.R.D.: Night Train (one-shot, September 2003) by Geoff Johns, Scott Kolins, and Dave Stewart.
 B.P.R.D.: There's Something Under My Bed (one-shot, November 2003) by Joe Harris, Adam Pollina, and Guillermo Zubiaga.
 Hellboy: Weird Tales – Volume 1 (TPB, December 2003)

2004
 Hellboy Junior (TPB, January 2004), includes "Hellboy Jr. vs. Hitler" by Bill Wray, Mike Mignola, and others.
 Hellboy Premiere Edition (one-shot, March 2004), includes "The Penanggalan" by Mike Mignola, "Born Again" by Mike Mignola, John Arcudi and Guy Davis.
 Hellboy: The Corpse (one-shot, March 2004) by Mike Mignola.
 B.P.R.D.: Plague of Frogs (5 issues, March–July 2004) by Mike Mignola and Guy Davis.
 The Goon #7 (June 2004) by Eric Powell, featuring Hellboy.
 The Dark Horse Book of Witchcraft (one-shot, July 2004), includes "The Troll-witch" by Mike Mignola.
 B.P.R.D.: The Soul of Venice & Other Stories (TPB, August 2004), includes "Another Day at the Office" by Mike Mignola and Cameron Stewart.
 Hellboy: Weird Tales – Volume 2 (TPB, October 2004)
 B.P.R.D.: The Dead (5 issues, November 2004 – March 2005) by Mike Mignola, John Arcudi and Guy Davis.

2005
 The Dark Horse Book of the Dead (one-shot, June 2005), includes "The Ghoul" by Mike Mignola.
 Hellboy: The Island (2 issues, June–July 2005) by Mike Mignola.
 B.P.R.D.: The Black Flame (6 issues, August 2005 – January 2006) by Mike Mignola, John Arcudi, and Guy Davis.

2006
 Hellboy: Makoma (2 issues, February–March 2006) by Mike Mignola and Richard Corben.
 Hellboy: Strange Places (TPB, April 2006), with a new epilogue for "The Island", by Mike Mignola.
 B.P.R.D.: The Universal Machine (5 issues, April–August 2006) by Mike Mignola, John Arcudi, and Guy Davis.
 Hellboy Animated: Phantom Limbs (one-shot, October 2006) by Jim Pascoe and Rick Lacy.
 The Dark Horse Book of Monsters (one-shot, December 2006), includes "The Hydra and the Lion" by Mike Mignola.

2007
 Hellboy Animated: The Black Wedding (TPB, January 2007) by Jim Pascoe, Tad Stones, Rick Lacy, and Fabio Laguna.
 B.P.R.D.: Garden of Souls (5 issues, March–July 2007) by Mike Mignola, John Arcudi, and Guy Davis.
 Hellboy Animated: The Yearning (one-shot, May 2007) by Jim Pascoe and Ben Stenbeck.
 Hellboy: Darkness Calls (6 issues, May–November 2007) by Mike Mignola and Duncan Fegredo.
 Hellboy Animated: Judgment Bell (TPB, June 2007) by Jim Pascoe, Tad Stones, and Rick Lacy.
 Hellboy: They That Go Down to the Sea in Ships (one-shot, August 2007) by Mike Mignola, Joshua Dysart, and Jason Shawn Alexander.
 B.P.R.D.: Killing Ground (5 issues, August–December 2007) by Mike Mignola, John Arcudi, and Guy Davis.
 Lobster Johnson: The Iron Prometheus (5 issues, September 2007 – January 2008) by Mike Mignola and Jason Armstrong.
 Hellboy: The Troll Witch and Others (TPB, October 2007), includes "The Vampire of Prague" by P. Craig Russell and Mike Mignola.
 Hellboy Animated: The Menagerie (TPB, December 2007) by Jason Hall, Nate Piekos, Rick Lacy, and Fabio Laguna.

2008
 Hellboy II: The Golden Army (promo, January 2008) by Mike Mignola, Guillermo del Toro, and Francisco Ruiz Velasco.
 B.P.R.D.: 1946 (5 issues, January–May 2008) by Mike Mignola, Joshua Dysart, and Paul Azaceta.
 Abe Sapien: The Drowning (5 issues, February–June 2008) by Mike Mignola and Jason Shawn Alexander.
 MySpace Dark Horse Presents #8–9 (March–April 2008), includes "B.P.R.D.: Revival" by John Arcudi.
 Hellboy: The Mole (one-shot, FCBD Edition, May 2008) by Mike Mignola, John Arcudi, Joshua Dysart, Duncan Fegredo, Guy Davis, and Paul Azaceta. 
 Hellboy: Darkness Calls (TPB, May 2008), with two new epilogues, by Mike Mignola and Duncan Fegredo.
 B.P.R.D.: The Ectoplasmic Man (one-shot, June 2008) by John Arcudi, Mike Mignola, and Ben Stenbeck.
 Hellboy: The Crooked Man (3 issues, July–September 2008) by Mike Mignola and Richard Corben.
 B.P.R.D.: The Warning (5 issues, July–November 2008) by Mike Mignola, John Arcudi, and Guy Davis.
 Hellboy: In the Chapel of Moloch (one-shot, October 2008) by Mike Mignola.
 B.P.R.D.: War on Frogs (5 issues, June 2008 – December 2009) by John Arcudi, Herb Trimpe, John Severin, Karl Moline, Peter Snejbjerg, and Guy Davis.
 Hellboy: The Wild Hunt (8 issues, December 2008 – March 2009 and August–November 2009) by Mike Mignola and Duncan Fegredo. There was a four-month interval between issues #4 and #5.

2009
 B.P.R.D.: The Black Goddess (5 issues, January–May 2009) by Mike Mignola, John Arcudi, and Guy Davis.
 B.P.R.D.: 1947 (5 issues, July–November 2009) by Mike Mignola, Joshua Dysart, Fábio Moon, and Gabriel Bá.
 Witchfinder: In the Service of Angels (5 issues, July–November 2009) by Mike Mignola and Ben Stenbeck.
 Abe Sapien: The Haunted Boy (one-shot, October 2009) by Mike Mignola, John Arcudi, and Patric Reynolds.
 Hellboy: The Bride of Hell (one-shot, December 2009) by Mike Mignola and Richard Corben.

2010
 B.P.R.D.: King of Fear (5 issues, January–May 2010) by Mike Mignola, John Arcudi, and Guy Davis.
 Hellboy in Mexico (or, A Drunken Blur) (one-shot, May 2010) by Mike Mignola and Richard Corben.
 Abe Sapien: The Abyssal Plain (2 issues, June–July 2010) by Mike Mignola, John Arcudi, and Peter Snejbjerg.
 Hellboy: The Storm (3 issues, July–September 2010) by Mike Mignola and Duncan Fegredo.
 Hellboy: Seed of Destruction (#1 For $1, August 2010) by Mike Mignola, Byrne, and Chiarello.
 B.P.R.D. Hell on Earth: New World (5 issues, August–December 2010) by Mike Mignola, John Arcudi, and Guy Davis.
 Hellboy: The Whittier Legacy (8 pages, October 2010) by Mike Mignola.
 Hellboy/Beasts of Burden: Sacrifice (one-shot, October 2010) by Mike Mignola, Evan Dorkin, and Jill Thompson.
 Hellboy: Double Feature of Evil (one-shot, November 2010) by Mike Mignola and Richard Corben.
 Hellboy: The Sleeping and the Dead (2 issues, December 2010 – February 2011) by Mike Mignola and Scott Hampton.

2011
 B.P.R.D. Hell on Earth: Gods (3 issues, January–March 2011) by Mike Mignola, John Arcudi, and Guy Davis.
 Witchfinder: Lost and Gone Forever (5 issues, February–June 2011) by Mike Mignola, John Arcuda, John Severine, and Dave Stewart.
 B.P.R.D. Hell on Earth: Seattle (Emerald City Comic-Con one-shot, March 2011) by Mike Mignola, John Arcudi and Guy Davis.
 Hellboy: Buster Oakley Gets His Wish (one-shot, April 2011) by Mike Mignola and Kevin Nowlan.
 B.P.R.D.: The Dead Remembered (3 issues, April–June 2011)
 Hellboy: Being Human (one-shot, May 2011) by Mike Mignola and Richard Corben.
 Hellboy: The Fury (3 issues, June–August 2011) by Mike Mignola and Duncan Fegredo.
 B.P.R.D. Hell on Earth: Monsters (2 issues, July–August 2011) by Mike Mignola, John Arcudi, and Tyler Crook.
 Abe Sapien: The Devil Does Not Jest (2 issues, September–October 2011) by Mike Mignola, John Arcudi, and James Harren.
 Hellboy: House of the Living Dead (Original Graphic Novel, November 2011) by Mike Mignola, Richard Corben.
 B.P.R.D. Hell on Earth: Russia (5 issues, September 2011 – January 2012) by Mike Mignola, John Arcudi, and Tyler Crook.
 Dark Horse Presents #7 (December 2011), includes Hellboy vs. the Aztec Mummy by Mike Mignola.

2012
 Lobster Johnson: The Burning Hand (5 issues, January–May 2012) by Mike Mignola, John Arcudi, and Tonči Zonjić.
 Dark Horse Presents #8 (January 2012), includes An Unmarked Grave by John Arcudi and Duncan Fegredo.
 B.P.R.D. Hell on Earth: The Long Death (3 issues, February–April 2012) by Mike Mignola, John Arcudi, and James Harren.
 Dark Horse Presents #9 (February 2012), includes Tony Masso's Finest Hour by Mike Mignola and Joe Querio.
 B.P.R.D. Hell on Earth: The Pickens County Horror (2 issues, March–April 2012) by Mike Mignola, Scott Allie, and Jason Latour.
 B.P.R.D. Hell on Earth: The Devil's Engine (3 issues, May–July 2012) by Mike Mignola, John Arcudi, and Tyler Crook.
 B.P.R.D. Hell on Earth: The Transformation of J.H. O'Donnell (one-shot, May 2012) by Mike Mignola, Scott Allie, and Max Fiumara.
 B.P.R.D. Hell on Earth: Exorcism (2 issues, June–July 2012) by Mike Mignola and Cameron Stewart.
 Lobster Johnson: The Prayer of Neferu (one-shot, August 2012) by Mike Mignola, John Arcudi, and Wilfredo Torres.
 B.P.R.D. Hell on Earth: Return of the Master (5 issues, August–December 2012) by Mike Mignola, John Arcudi, and Tyler Crook.
 Lobster Johnson: Caput Mortuum (one-shot, September 2012) by Mike Mignola, John Arcudi, and Tonči Zonjić.
 B.P.R.D.: 1948 (5 issues, October 2012 – February 2013) by Mike Mignola, John Arcudi, and Max Fiumara.
 Hellboy in Hell #1–4 (December 2012 – March 2013) by Mike Mignola.

2013
 B.P.R.D. Hell on Earth: The Abyss of Time (2 issues, January–February 2013) by Mike Mignola, Scott Allie, and James Harren.
 Sledgehammer 44 (2 issues, March–April 2013) by Mike Mignola, John Arcudi, and Jason Latour.
 B.P.R.D. Hell on Earth: A Cold Day in Hell (2 issues, March–April 2013) by Mike Mignola, John Arcudi, and Peter Snejbjerg.
 B.P.R.D.: Vampire (5 issues, March–July 2013) by Mike Mignola, Fábio Moon, and Gabriel Bá.
 Abe Sapien: Dark and Terrible (3 issues, April–June 2013) by Mike Mignola, Scott Allie, and Sebastián Fiumara.
 Lobster Johnson: Satan Smells a Rat (1 issue, May 2013) by Mike Mignola, John Arcudi, and Kevin Nowlan.
 B.P.R.D. Hell on Earth: Wasteland (3 issues, May–July 2013) by Mike Mignola, John Arcudi, and Laurence Campbell.
 Abe Sapien: The New Race of Man (2 issues, July–August 2013) by Mike Mignola, John Arcudi, and Max Fiumara.
 Lobster Johnson: A Scent of Lotus (2 issues, July–August 2013) by Mike Mignola, John Arcudi, Sebastián Fiumara, Dave Stewart, and Tonči Zonjić.
 Itty Bitty Hellboy (5 issues, August–December 2013) by Art Baltazar and Franco.
 B.P.R.D. Hell on Earth: Lake of Fire (5 issues, August–December 2013) by Mike Mignola, John Arcudi, and Tyler Crook.
 Abe Sapien: The Shape of Things to Come (2 issues, October–November 2013) by Mike Mignola, Scott Allie, Sebastián Fiumara, and Dave Stewart.
 Hellboy: The Midnight Circus (Graphic novel, October 2013) by Mike Mignola, Duncan Fegredo, and Dave Stewart.
 Sledgehammer 44: Lightning War (3 issues, November 2013 – January 2014) by Mike Mignola, John Arcudi, and Laurence Campbell.
 Abe Sapien: The Land of the Dead (one-shot, December 2013) by Mike Mignola, Scott Allie, and Michael Avon Oeming.
 Hellboy in Hell: The Three Golden Whips (one-shot, December 2013) by Mike Mignola and Dave Stewart.
 Dark Horse Presents #31, 32 (December 2013 – January 2014), includes Hellboy Gets Married by Mike Mignola, Mike McMahon, Dave Stewart, and Clem Robins.

2014
 B.P.R.D. Hell on Earth: The Reign of the Black Flame (5 issues, January – May 2014) by Mike Mignola, John Arcudi, and James Harren.
 Abe Sapien: To the Last Man (3 issues, January – March 2014) by Mike Mignola, Scott Allie, and Max Fiumara.
 Lobster Johnson: Get the Lobster (5 issues, February – August 2014) by Mike Mignola, John Arcudi, and Tonči Zonjić.
 Hellboy 20th Anniversary Sampler (one-shot, March 2014), includes reprints of The Ghoul and Another Day at the Office with new story The Coffin Man by Mike Mignola, Fabio Moon and Dave Stewart.
 Abe Sapien: The Garden (one-shot, May 2014) by Mike Mignola, Scott Allie and Max Fiumara.
 Hellboy in Hell: The Death Card (one-shot, May 2014) by Mike Mignola and Dave Stewart.
 Dark Horse Presents #36 (May 2014), includes Witchfinder: Beware the Ape by Mike Mignola, Ben Stenbeck and Dave Stewart.
 Abe Sapien: The Healer (one-shot, June 2014) by Mike Mignola, Scott Allie and Sebastian Fiumara.
 Witchfinder: The Mysteries of Unland (5 issues, June – October 2014) by Kim Newman, Maura McHugh, Tyler Crook and Dave Stewart.
 B.P.R.D. Hell on Earth: The Devil's Wings (2 issues, June – July 2014) by Mike Mignola, John Arcudi and Laurence Campbell.
 Abe Sapien: Visions, Dreams, and Fishin' (one-shot, July 2014) by Mike Mignola, Scott Allie and Max Fiumara.
 Abe Sapien: Lost Lives (one-shot, August 2014) by Mike Mignola, Scott Allie and Juan Ferreyra.
 B.P.R.D. Hell on Earth: The Broken Equation (2 issues, August – September 2014) by Mike Mignola, John Arcudi and Joe Querio.
 Abe Sapien: Sacred Places (2 issues, September – October 2014) by Mike Mignola, Scott Allie, Sebastian Fiumara, and Dave Stewart. 
 B.P.R.D. Hell on Earth: Grind (one-shot, October 2014) by Mike Mignola, John Arcudi and Tyler Crook.
 B.P.R.D. Hell on Earth: Flesh and Stone (5 issues, November 2014 – March 2015) by Mike Mignola, John Arcudi and James Harren.
 Hellboy and the B.P.R.D.: 1952 (5 issues, December 2014 – April 2015) by Mike Mignola, John Arcudi and Alex Maleev.
 Abe Sapien: A Darkness So Great (5 issues, December 2014 – April 2015) by Mike Mignola, Scott Allie, Max Fiumara, Sebastian Fiumara and R. Sikoryak.

2015
 Dark Horse Presents #7/200 (February 2015), includes Hellboy: The Coffin Man 2: The Rematch by Mike Mignola and Gabriel Bá.
 Frankenstein Underground (5 issues, March – July 2015) by Mike Mignola and Ben Stenbeck.
 B.P.R.D. Hell on Earth: Nowhere, Nothing, Never (3 issues, April – June 2015) by Mike Mignola, John Arcudi and Peter Snejbjerg.
 Abe Sapien: The Ogopogo (one-shot, May 2015) by Mike Mignola, Scott Allie and Kevin Nowlan.
 Dark Horse Presents #11 (May 2015), includes Abe Sapien: Subconscious by Mike Mignola, John Arcudi and Mark Nelson.
 Abe Sapien: The Shadow Over Suwanee (3 issues, July – August 2015) by Mike Mignola, Scott Allie, Sebastian Fiumara, Max Fiumara and Tyler Crook.
 B.P.R.D. Hell on Earth: Modern Prometheus (2 issues, July – August 2015) by Mike Mignola, John Arcudi and Julián Totino Tedesco.
 Lobster Johnson: A Chain Forged in Life  (one-shot, July 2015) by Mike Mignola, John Arcudi, Troy Nixey and Kevin Nowlan.
 Hellboy in Hell: The Hounds of Pluto (2 issues, August – September 2015) by Mike Mignola and Dave Stewart.
 B.P.R.D. Hell on Earth: End of Days (5 issues, September 2015 – January 2016) by Mike Mignola, John Arcudi and Laurence Campbell.
 Abe Sapien: Icthyo Sapien (one-shot, October 2015) by Mike Mignola, Scott Allie and Alise Gluškova.
 Hellboy and the B.P.R.D. 1953: The Phantom Hand & The Kelpie (one-shot, October 2015) by Mike Mignola and Ben Stenbeck.
 Abe Sapien: The Garden II (2 issues, November – December 2015) by Mike Mignola, Scott Allie and Max Fiumara.
 Dark Horse Presents #16 (November 2015), includes Hellboy: The Excorcist of Vorsk by Mike Mignola, Todd Mignola and Dave Stewart.
 Hellboy and the B.P.R.D. 1953: The Witch Tree & Rawhead and Bloody Bones (one-shot, November 2015) by Mike Mignola and Ben Stenbeck.
 Lobster Johnson: The Glass Mantis (one-shot, December 2015) by Mike Mignola, John Arcudi and Toni Fejzula.

2016
 Hellboy: Winter Special (one-shot, January 2016) by Mike Mignola, Chelsea Cain, Scott Allie, Chris Roberson, Michael Avon Oeming, Tim Sale, and Michael Walsh.
 Abe Sapien: Witchcraft & Demonology (one-shot, January 2016) by Mike Mignola, Scott Allie, and Santiago Caruso.
 Abe Sapien: The Black School (one-shot, January 2016) by Mike Mignola, Scott Allie, and Sebastián Fiumara.
 Hellboy and the B.P.R.D. 1953: Beyond the Fences (3 issues, February – April 2016) by Mike Mignola, Chris Roberson, Paolo Rivera, and Jim Rivera.
 B.P.R.D. Hell on Earth: The Exorcist (3 issues, February – April 2016) by Mike Mignola and Cameron Stewart.
 Lobster Johnson: The Forgotten Man (one-shot, April 2016) by Mike Mignola, John Arcudi, and Peter Snejbjerg.
 Abe Sapien: Regressions (2 issues, April – May 2016) by Mike Mignola, Scott Allie, and Max Fiumara.
 Hellboy in Hell: The Spanish Bride (one-shot, May 2016) by Mike Mignola and Dave Stewart.
 Lobster Johnson: Metal Monsters of Midtown (3 issues, May – July 2016) by Mike Mignola, John Arcudi, and Tonci Zonjic.
 Hellboy in Hell: For Whom the Bell Tolls (one-shot, June 2016) by Mike Mignola and Dave Stewart.
 Abe Sapien: Dark and Terrible Deep (one-shot, June 2016) by Mike Mignola, Scott Allie, and Sebastián Fiumara.
 Abe Sapien: The Garden III (one-shot, July 2016) by Mike Mignola, Scott Allie, and Max Fiumara.
 B.P.R.D. Hell on Earth: Cometh the Hour (5 issues, July – November 2016) by Mike Mignola, John Arcudi, Laurence Campbell, and Dave Stewart.
 Abe Sapien: The Desolate Shore (one-shot, August 2016) by Mike Mignola, Scott Allie, and Sebastián Fiumara.
 Hellboy and the B.P.R.D. 1954: Black Sun (2 issues, September – October 2016) by Mike Mignola, Chris Roberson, Stephen Green, and Dave Stewart.
 Rise of the Black Flame (5 issues, September 2016 – January 2017) by Mike Mignola, Chris Roberson, and Christopher Mitten .
 Hellboy and the B.P.R.D. 1954: The Unreasoning Beast (one-shot, November 2016) by Mike Mignola, Chris Roberson, Patrick Reynolds, and Dave Stewart.

2017
 Hellboy Winter Special 2017 (one-shot, January 2017) by Mike Mignola, Chris Roberson, Scott Allie, Paul Grist, Christopher Mitten, Sebastian Fiumara, Dave Stewart and Bill Crabtree.
 Lobster Johnson: Garden of Bones (one-shot, January 2017) by Mike Mignola, John Arcudi, and Stephen Green.
 The Visitor: How & Why He Stayed (5 issues, February – July 2017) by Mike Mignola, Chris Roberson, and Paul Grist.
 Hellboy and the B.P.R.D. 1954: Ghost Moon (2 issues, March – April 2017) by Mike Mignola, Chris Roberson, Brian Churilla, and Dave Stewart.
 Lobster Johnson: The Pirate's Ghost (3 issues, March – May 2017) by Mike Mignola, John Arcudi, and Tonci Zonjic.
 Hellboy: Into the Silent Sea (Graphic novel, April 2017) by Mike Mignola, Gary Gianni, and Dave Stewart.
 B.P.R.D. The Devil You Know: Messiah (5 issues, July – December 2017) by Mike Mignola, Scott Allie, Laurence Campbell, and Dave Stewart.
 Lobster Johnson: Mangekyō (one-shot, August 2017) by Mike Mignola, John Arcudi, and Ben Stenbeck.
 Hellboy and the B.P.R.D. 1955: Secret Nature (one-shot, August 2017) by Mike Mignola, Chris Roberson, Shawn Martinbrough, and Dave Stewart.
 Hellboy and the B.P.R.D. 1955: Occult Intelligence (3 issues, September – November 2017) by Mike Mignola, Chris Roberson, Brian Churilla, and Dave Stewart.
 Hellboy: Kramupsnacht (one-shot, December 2017) by Mike Mignola and Adam Hughes.
 Rasputin: The Voice of the Dragon (5 issues, November 2017 – March 2018) by Mike Mignola, Chris Roberson, and Christopher Mitten.

2018
 Hellboy and the B.P.R.D. 1955: Burning Season (one-shot, February 2018) by Mike Mignola, Chris Roberson, Paolo Rivera, Joe Rivera, and Dave Stewart.
 Koshchei the Deathless (6 issues, January – June 2018) by Mike Mignola and Ben Stenbeck.
 B.P.R.D.: The Devil You Know: Pandemonium (5 issues, May – September 2018) by Mike Mignola, Scott Allie, Sebastián Fiumara, Laurence Campbell.
 Sir Edward Grey: Witchfinder: The Gates of Heaven (5 issues, May – September 2018) by Mike Mignola, Chris Roberson, D’Israeli, Michelle Madsen.
 Hellboy and the B.P.R.D. 1956 (5 issues, November 2018 – March 2019) by Mike Mignola, Chris Roberson, Yishan Li, Mike Norton, Michael Avon Oeming.
 Crimson Lotus (5 issues, November 2018 – March 2019) by John Arcudi, Mindy Lee, Michelle Madsen.
 Hellboy Winter Special 2018 (one-shot, December 2018) by Mike Mignola, Fabio Moon, Gabriel Ba, Tonci Zonjic, Ben Stenbeck and Dave Stewart.
 B.P.R.D.: The Devil You Know: Ragna Rok (5 issues, December 2018 – April 2019) by Mike Mignola, Scott Allie, Laurence Campbell, Christopher Mitten.

2019
 Hellboy vs. Lobster Johnson: The Ring of Death (one-shot, May 2019) by Mike Mignola, Chris Roberson, Mike Norton, Dave Stewart. Includes Down Mexico Way by Mike Mignola, Chris Roberson, Paul Grist, Bill Crabtree.
 Hellboy and the B.P.R.D.: Beast of Vargu (one-shot, June 2019) by Mike Mignola, Duncan Fegredo, Dave Stewart. Includes The Secret God of the Roma.
 Hellboy and the B.P.R.D.: Saturn Returns (3 issues, August – October 2019) by Mike Mignola, Scott Allie, Christopher Mitten, Brennan Wagner.
 Hellboy and the B.P.R.D.: Long Night at Goloski Station (one-shot, October 2019) by Mike Mignola, Matt Smith, Dave Stewart.
 Sir Edward Grey: Witchfinder: The Reign of Darkness (5 issues, November 2019 – March 2020) by Mike Mignola, Chris Roberson, Christopher Mitten, Michelle Madsen.

2020
 Hellboy Winter Special (2019) (one-shot, January 2020). Includes The Miser's Gift by Mike Mignola and Márk László, The Longest Night by Chris Roberson and Leila del Duca, The Beast of Ingelheim by Scott Allie and Andrea Mutti.
 Frankenstein Undone (5 issues, January – May 2020) by Mike Mignola, Scott Allie, Ben Stenbeck, Brennan Wagner - series canceled after second issue following sexual harassment allegations surrounding Allie.
 Hellboy and the B.P.R.D.: The Return of Effie Kolb (2 issues, February – October 2020) by Mike Mignola, Zach Howard, Dave Stewart.
 Fearless Dawn Meets Hellboy (one-shot, September 2020) by Mike Mignola and Steve Mannion.
 Hellboy and the B.P.R.D.: The Seven Wives Club (one-shot, November 2020) by Mike Mignola, Adam Hughes.
 Hellboy and the B.P.R.D.: Her Fatal Hour and The Sending (one-shot, December 2020) by Mike Mignola, Tiernen Trevallion, Dave Stewart.

2021
 Young Hellboy: The Hidden Land (4 issues, February – May 2021) by Mike Mignola, Tom Sniegoski, Craig Rousseau, Dave Stewart
 A Sarah Jewell Mystery: The House of Lost Horizons (5 issues, May – September 2021) by Mike Mignola, Chris Roberson, Leila del Duca and Michelle Madsen.
 Hellboy and the B.P.R.D.: The Secret of Chesbro House (2 issues, July – August 2021) by Mike Mignola, Christopher Golden, Shawn McManus and Dave Stewart.
 Hellboy and the B.P.R.D.: 1957 — Family Ties (one-shot, September 2021) by Mike Mignola, Chris Roberson, Laurence Campbell and Dave Stewart.
 Hellboy: The Silver Lantern Club (5 issues, October 2021 – February 2022) by Mike Mignola, Chris Roberson, Christopher Mitten, Ben Stenbeck and Michelle Madsen.
 Hellboy: The Bones of Giants (4 issues, November 2021 – February 2022) by Mike Mignola, Christopher Golden, Matt Smith and Chris O'Halloran.
 Sir Edward Grey: Acheron (one-shot, December 2021) by Mike Mignola and Dave Stewart.

2022
 The Sword of Hyperborea (4 issues, January – April 2022) by Mike Mignola, Rob Williams, Laurence Campbell and Quinton Winter.
 Hellboy and the B.P.R.D.: 1957 — Forgotten Lives (one-shot, February 2021) by Mike Mignola, Chris Roberson, Stephen Green and Dave Stewart.
 The British Paranormal Society: Time Out of Mind (4 issues, April – July 2022) by Mike Mignola, Chris Roberson, Andrea Mutti and Lee Loughridge.
 Hellboy and the B.P.R.D.: Night of the Cyclops (one-shot, May 2022) by Mike Mignola and Olivier Vatine.
 Hellboy and the B.P.R.D.: 1957 — Falling Sky (one-shot, June 2022) by Mike Mignola, Chris Roberson, Shawn Martinbrough and Dave Stewart.
 Hellboy and the B.P.R.D.: Old Man Whittier (one-shot, June 2022) by Mike Mignola and Gabriel Hernández Walta.
 Hellboy and the B.P.R.D.: Time Is a River (one-shot, July 2022) by Mike Mignola, Márk László and Dave Stewart.
 Hellboy and the B.P.R.D.: 1957 — Fearful Symmetry (one-shot, July 2022) by Mike Mignola, Chris Roberson, Alison Sampson and Dave Stewart.
 Young Hellboy: Assault on Castle Death (4 issues, July – October 2022) by Mike Mignola, Tom Sniegoski, Craig Rousseau and Chris O'Halloran.
 Frankenstein: New World (4 issues, August – November 2022) by Mike Mignola, Christopher Golden, Thomas Sniegoski, Peter Bergting and Michelle Madsen.
 Hellboy and the B.P.R.D.: 1957 — From Below (one-shot, August 2022) by Mike Mignola, Chris Roberson, Mike Norton and Dave Stewart.
 Castle Full of Blackbirds (4 issues, September – December 2022) by Angela Slatter, Valeria Burzo and Michelle Madsen.
 Hellboy in Love (5 issues, October – February 2023) by Mike Mignola, Christopher Golden, Matt Smith and Chris O'Halloran.

Cancelled
 The Last Knight of St. Hagan (4 issues, originally intended to debut in April 2020) by Mike Mignola, Scott Allie, Andrea Mutt, Lee Loughridge - series canceled before publication of first issue following sexual harassment allegations surrounding Allie.

List of Hellboy Universe collections

Hellboy trade paperbacks
Most of the Hellboy comics have been collected by Dark Horse as trade paperbacks.

 Hellboy Volume 1: Seed of Destruction (October 1994) – Art by Mike Mignola. Script by John Byrne. Collects Seed of Destruction #1–4; the Mike Mignola's Hellboy promo (from San Diego Comic-Con Comics #2); the Mike Mignola's Hellboy: World's Greatest Paranormal Investigator promo (from Comics Buyer's Guide #1,070); sketchbook and art gallery.
 Hellboy Volume 2: Wake the Devil (May 1997) – Written by Mike Mignola. Colors by James Sinclair. Separations by Dave Stewart. Letters by Pat Brosseau. Collects Wake the Devil #1–5.
 Hellboy Volume 3: The Chained Coffin and Others (August 1998) – Written by Mike Mignola. Colors by Dave Stewart. Letters by Pat Brosseau. Collects The Chained Coffin (from Dark Horse Presents #100-2)'; Hellboy Christmas Special; Almost Colossus #1–2; The Corpse and the Iron Shoes; The Wolves of Saint August (from Dark Horse Presents #88–91).
 Hellboy Volume 4: The Right Hand of Doom (April 2000) – Written by Mike Mignola. Colors by Dave Stewart. Letters by Pat Brosseau. Collects Pancakes (from Dark Horse Presents Annual 1999); The Nature of the Beast (from Dark Horse Presents #151'); King Vold; Heads (from Abe Sapien: Drums of the Dead); Goodbye, Mr. Tod (from Gary Gianni's The MonsterMen); The Vârcolac, The Right Hand of Doom (from Dark Horse Presents Annual 1998; Box Full of Evil #1–2.
 Hellboy Volume 5:: Conqueror Worm (February 2002) – Written by Mike Mignola. Colors by Dave Stewart. Letters by Pat Brosseau. Collects Hellboy: Conqueror Worm #1–4.
 Hellboy Volume 6: Strange Places (April 2006) – Written by Mike Mignola. Collects The Island #1–2; The Third Wish #1–2.
 Hellboy Volume 7: The Troll Witch and Others (November 2007) – Written by Mike Mignola. Collects The Penanggalan (from Hellboy Premiere Edition); The Hydra and The Lion (from  The Dark Horse Book of Monsters); The Troll Witch (from The Dark Horse Book of Witchcraft); Dr. Carps Experiment (from The Dark Horse Book of Hauntings); The Ghoul (from The Dark Horse Book of The Dead); The Vampire of Prague; Makoma #1–2.
 Hellboy Volume 8: Darkness Calls (May 2008) – Story and cover by Mike Mignola. Art by Duncan Fegredo. Collects Darkness Calls #1–6.
 Hellboy Volume 9: The Wild Hunt (March 2010) – Story and cover by Mike Mignola. Art by Duncan Fegredo. Colors by Dave Stewart. Collects The Wild Hunt #1–8.
 Hellboy Volume 10: The Crooked Man and Others (June 2010) – Story and cover by Mike Mignola, Joshua Dysart. Art by Richard Corben, Jason Shawn Alexander, Duncan Fegredo. Colors by Dave Stewart. Collects The Crooked Man #1–3; They That Go Down to the Sea in Ships; The Mole (from Free Comic Book Day 2008); In the Chapel of Moloch.
 Hellboy Volume 11: The Bride of Hell and Others (October 2011) – Story and cover by Mike Mignola. Art by Mignola, Richard Corben, Kevin Nowlan, Scott Hampton. Colors by Nowlan, Dave Stewart. Collects Hellboy in Mexico; Double Feature of Evil; The Sleeping and the Dead #1–2; The Bride of Hell; The Whittier Legacy; Buster Oakley Gets His Wish.
 Hellboy Volume 12: The Storm and the Fury (March 2012) – Story and cover by Mike Mignola. Art by Duncan Fegredo. Colors by Dave Stewart. Collects The Storm #1–3; The Fury #1–3.
 Hellboy in Mexico (April 2016) – Story and cover by Mike Mignola. Art by Mignola, Richard Corben, Mick McMahon, Fábio Moon, Gabriel Bá. Colors by Dave Stewart. Collects Hellboy in Mexico; House of the Living Dead; Hellboy versus the Aztec Mummy; Hellboy Gets Married; The Coffin Man; The Coffin Man 2: The Rematch.

After six years Dark Horse have resumed releasing Hellboyverse comics by its original title. Following arcs have been collected in individual standard size hardcovers.

 Hellboy: The Silver Lantern Club (July 2022) – Story by Mike Mignola and Chris Roberson. Art by Christopher Mitten and Ben Stenbeck. Collects The Silver Lantern Club #1–5.
 Hellboy: The Bones of Giants (July 2022) – Story by Mike Mignola and Christopher Golden. Art by Matt Smith. Collects The Bones of Giants #1–4.

Hellboy in Hell trade paperbacks
 Hellboy in Hell Volume 1: The Descent (May 2014) – Story and cover by Mike Mignola. Art by Mignola. Colors by Dave Stewart. Collects Hellboy in Hell #1–5.
 Hellboy in Hell Volume 2: The Death Card (October 2016) – Story and cover by Mike Mignola. Art by Mignola. Colors by Dave Stewart. Collects Hellboy in Hell #6–10; The Exorcist of Vorsk.

Hellboy library editions
Each volume includes extensive supplemental materials, including previously unreleased sketches and designs.

 Hellboy: Library Edition Volume I (May 2008) – Collects Seed of Destruction and Wake the Devil. (However this is missing the Gallery from the TPB version of Wake the Devil.)
 Hellboy: Library Edition Volume II (October 2008) – Collects The Chained Coffin and Others and The Right Hand of Doom.
 Hellboy: Library Edition Volume III (September 2009) – Collects Conqueror Worm and Strange Places.
 Hellboy: Library Edition Volume IV (July 2011) – Collects The Troll Witch and Others and The Crooked Man and Others, without "The Mole".
 Hellboy: Library Edition Volume V (July 2012) – Collects Darkness Calls and The Wild Hunt, with "The Mole".
 Hellboy: Library Edition Volume VI (June 2013) – Collects The Storm and the Fury and The Bride of Hell and Others.
 Hellboy in Hell: Library Edition (October 2017) – Collects The Descent and The Death Card.

Hellboy omnibus editionsHellboy softcover omnibus editions collecting the complete Hellboy series in chronological order.
 Hellboy Omnibus Volume 1: Seed of Destruction (June 2018) – Collects Seed of Destruction #1–4, Wake the Devil #1–5, The Wolves of St August, The Chained Coffin, and Almost Colossus #1–2. 
 Hellboy Omnibus Volume 2: Strange Places (July 2018) – Collects The Right Hand of Doom, Box Full of Evil #1-2, Being Human, Conqueror Worm #1–4, The Third Wish #1–2, The Island #1–2 and Into the Silent Sea. 
 Hellboy Omnibus Volume 3: The Wild Hunt (July 2018) – Collects Darkness Calls #1–6, The Wild Hunt #1–8, The Storm #1–3, The Fury #1–3, and The Mole. 
 Hellboy Omnibus Volume 4: Hellboy in Hell (September 2018) – Collects Hellboy in Hell #1-10, The Exorcist of Vorsk, and The Magician and the Snake.
 Hellboy: The Complete Short Stories Volume 1 (June 2018) – Collects The Corpse, Pancakes, The Nature of the Beast, King Vold, The Penanggalan, The Crooked Man #1-3, Hellboy in Mexico, Double Feature of Evil, Hellboy versus the Aztec Mummy, Hellboy Gets Married, The Coffin Man, The Coffin Man 2: The Rematch, The Midnight Circus, and House of the Living Dead.
 Hellboy: The Complete Short Stories Volume 2 (August 2018) – Collects The Hydra and the Lion, The Troll Witch, The Baba Yaga, The Sleeping and the Dead, Heads, Goodbye Mister Tod, The Vârcolac, The Vampire of Prague, The Bride of Hell, The Whittier Legacy, Buster Oakley Gets His Wish, They That Go Down to the Sea in Ships, A Christmas Underground, Dr. Carp's Experiment, The Ghoul, In the Chapel of Moloch, and Makoma #1-2.Hellboy Omnibus Boxed Set was announced to be released in September 2021. It collects complete set of Hellboy omnibuses volumes 1–4 in one slipcase.

B.P.R.D. trade paperbacks
Most of the B.P.R.D. comics have been collected by Dark Horse as trade paperbacks.

 B.P.R.D. Volume 1: Hollow Earth and Other Stories (January 2003) – Collects Hollow Earth #1–3, "B.P.R.D." promo, The Killer in My Skull, Abe Sapien versus Science, Drums of the Dead, sketchbook.
 B.P.R.D. Volume 2: The Soul of Venice and Other Stories (August 2004) – Collects The Soul of Venice, Dark Waters, Night Train, There's Something Under My Bed, Another Day at the Office, sketchbook.
 B.P.R.D. Volume 3: Plague of Frogs (February 2005) – Collects Plague of Frogs #1–5, sketchbook.
 B.P.R.D. Volume 4: The Dead (September 2005) – Collects Born Again, The Dead #1–5, sketchbook.
 B.P.R.D. Volume 5: The Black Flame (July 2006) – Collects The Black Flame #1–6, sketchbook.
 B.P.R.D. Volume 6: The Universal Machine (January 2007) – Collects The Universal Machine #1–5, sketchbook.
 B.P.R.D. Volume 7: Garden of Souls (January 2008) – Collects Garden of Souls #1–5, sketchbook.
 B.P.R.D. Volume 8: Killing Ground (May 2008) – Collects Killing Ground #1–5, sketchbook.
 B.P.R.D. Volume 9: 1946 (November 2008) – Collects 1946 #1–5, Bishop Olek's Devil, sketchbook.
 B.P.R.D. Volume 10: The Warning (April 2009) – Collects Out of Reach, The Warning #1–5, sketchbook.
 B.P.R.D. Volume 11: The Black Goddess (October 2009) – Collects The Black Goddess #1–5, sketchbook, "Latchkey Memories from Crab Point" feature.
 B.P.R.D. Volume 12: War on Frogs (April 2010) – Collects War on Frogs #1–4, Revival, sketchbook.
 B.P.R.D. Volume 13: 1947 (July 2010) – Collects 1947 #1–5, And What Shall I Find There?, sketchbook.
 B.P.R.D. Volume 14: King of Fear (November 2010, 0) – Collects King of Fear #1–5, sketchbook.
 B.P.R.D.: Being Human (December 2011) – Collects The Dead Remembered #1–3, Casualties, Being Human, The Ectoplasmic Man. B.P.R.D.: 1948 (September 2013) – Collects 1948 #1–5.
 B.P.R.D.: Vampire (November 2013) – Collects Vampire #1–5.

B.P.R.D.: Hell on Earth trade paperbacksHell on Earth collects the next series of B.P.R.D. picking up after King of Fear.

 B.P.R.D.: Hell on Earth Volume 1: New World (August 2011) – Collects New World #1–5, Seattle, sketchbook.
 B.P.R.D.: Hell on Earth Volume 2: Gods and Monsters (January 2012) – Collects Gods #1–3, Monsters #1–2, sketchbook.
 B.P.R.D.: Hell on Earth Volume 3: Russia (August 2012) – Collects Russia #1–5, An Unmarked Grave, sketchbook.
 B.P.R.D.: Hell on Earth Volume 4: The Devil's Engine & The Long Death (December 2012) – Collects The Devil's Engine #1–3, The Long Death #1–3.
 B.P.R.D.: Hell on Earth Volume 5: The Pickens County Horror and Others (July 2013) – Collects The Pickens County Horror #1–2, The Transformation of J.H. O'Donnell, B.P.R.D.: Hell on Earth #103–104.
 B.P.R.D.: Hell on Earth Volume 6: The Return of the Master (August 2013) – Collects The Return of the Master #1–2, B.P.R.D.: Hell on Earth #100–102.
 B.P.R.D.: Hell on Earth Volume 7: A Cold Day in Hell (January 2014) – Collects B.P.R.D.: Hell on Earth #105–109.
 B.P.R.D.: Hell on Earth Volume 8: Lake of Fire (April 2014) – Collects B.P.R.D.: Hell on Earth #110–114.
 B.P.R.D.: Hell on Earth Volume 9: The Reign of the Black Flame (September 2014) – Collects B.P.R.D.: Hell on Earth #115–119.
 B.P.R.D.: Hell on Earth Volume 10: The Devil's Wings (February 2015) – Collects B.P.R.D.: Hell on Earth #120–124.
 B.P.R.D.: Hell on Earth Volume 11: Flesh And Stone (September 2015) – Collects B.P.R.D.: Hell on Earth #125–129.
 B.P.R.D.: Hell on Earth Volume 12: Metamorphosis (December 2015) – Collects B.P.R.D.: Hell on Earth #130–134.
 B.P.R.D.: Hell on Earth Volume 13: End of Days (May 2016) – Collects B.P.R.D.: Hell on Earth #135–139.
 B.P.R.D.: Hell on Earth Volume 14: The Exorcist (September 2016) – Collects Exorcism  #1–2, B.P.R.D.: Hell on Earth #140–142.
 B.P.R.D.: Hell on Earth Volume 15: Cometh the Hour (March 2017) – Collects B.P.R.D.: Hell on Earth #143–147.

B.P.R.D.: The Devil You Know trade paperbacks
Trade paperbacks collecting The Devil You Know cycle:

 B.P.R.D.: The Devil You Know Volume 1: Messiah (April 2018) – Collects B.P.R.D.: The Devil You Know #148–152, Broken Vessels.
 B.P.R.D.: The Devil You Know Volume 2: Pandemonium (February 2019) – Collects B.P.R.D.: The Devil You Know #153–157.
 B.P.R.D.: The Devil You Know Volume 3: Ragna Rok (July 2019) – Collects B.P.R.D.: The Devil You Know #158–162.

B.P.R.D. omnibus editionsB.P.R.D. hardcover omnibus editions collecting multiple trade paperbacks.

 B.P.R.D.: Plague of Frogs, Volume 1 (February 2011, ; SC: November 2014) – Collects Hollow Earth and Other Stories, The Soul of Venice and Other Stories, Plague of Frogs, extended sketchbook.
 B.P.R.D.: Plague of Frogs, Volume 2 (August 2011, ; SC: February 2015) – Collects The Dead, The Black Flame, War on Frogs, extended sketchbook.
 B.P.R.D.: Plague of Frogs, Volume 3 (April 2012, ; SC: April 2015) – Collects The Universal Machine, Garden of Souls, Killing Ground, extended sketchbook.
 B.P.R.D.: Plague of Frogs, Volume 4 (November 2012, ; SC: June 2015) – Collects The Warning, The Black Goddess, King of Fear, extended sketchbook.
 B.P.R.D.: 1946–1948 (June 2015, ; SC: March 2020) – Collects 1946, 1947, and 1948.
 B.P.R.D.: Hell on Earth, Volume 1 (December 2017, ; SC: March 2021) – Collects New World, Gods and Monsters, and Russia.
 B.P.R.D.: Hell on Earth, Volume 2 (April 2018) – Collects The Devil's Engine & The Long Death, The Pickens County Horror & Others, and The Return of the Master.
 B.P.R.D.: Hell on Earth, Volume 3 (October 2018) – Collects A Cold Day in Hell, Lake of Fire, and The Reign of the Black Flame.
 B.P.R.D.: Hell on Earth, Volume 4 (January 2019) – Collects The Devil's Wings, Flesh and Stone, and The Exorcist.
 B.P.R.D.: Hell on Earth, Volume 5 (March 2019) – Collects Metamorphosis, End of Days, and Cometh the Hour.
 B.P.R.D.: The Devil You Know (March 2021) – Collects Messiah, Pandemonium, Ragna Rok.

Hellboy and the B.P.R.D. trade paperbacks
 Hellboy and the B.P.R.D.: 1952 (August 2015) – Collects Hellboy and the B.P.R.D. 1952 #1–5.
 Hellboy and the B.P.R.D.: 1953 (August 2016) – Collects The Phantom Hand, Rawhead and Bloody Bones, The Witch Tree, The Kelpie, Wandering Souls, Beyond the Fences #1-3.
 Hellboy and the B.P.R.D.: 1954 (January 2018) – Collects Black Sun #1–2, The Unreasoning Beast, Ghost Moon #1–2, The Mirror.
 Hellboy and the B.P.R.D.: 1955 (June 2018) – Collects Secret Nature, Occult Intelligence #1–3, Burning Season.
 Hellboy and the B.P.R.D.: 1956 (September 2019) – Collects Hellboy and the B.P.R.D. 1956 #1–5, Hellboy vs. Lobster Johnson: The Ring of Death, Down Mexico Way.
 Hellboy and the B.P.R.D.: The Beast of Vargu and Others (June 2020) – Collects Return of the Lambton Worm, The Beast of Vargu, The Secret God of the Roma, Saturn Returns #1-3, Krampusnacht.
 Hellboy and the B.P.R.D.: The Return of Effie Kolb and Others (November 2022) – Collects Her Fatal Hour, The Sending, Long Night at Goloski Station, The Return of Effie Kolb, The Seven Wives Club".
 Hellboy and the B.P.R.D.: 1957 (February 2023) – Collects Falling Sky, Family Ties, Forgotten Lives, Fearful Symmetry, From Below, Happy New Year, Ava Galluci.

Hellboy and the B.P.R.D. omnibus editions
Hellboy and the B.P.R.D. hardcover omnibus editions collecting multiple trade paperbacks.

 Hellboy and the B.P.R.D.: 1952–1954 (May 2021) – Collects 1952, 1953, and 1954.

Young Hellboy trade paperbacks
 Young Hellboy: The Hidden Land (September 2021) – Collects The Hidden Land #1–4.

Abe Sapien trade paperbacks
 Abe Sapien Volume 1: The Drowning (September 2008) – Collects The Drowning #1–5, sketchbook.
 Abe Sapien Volume 2: The Devil Does Not Jest and Other Stories (May 2012) – Collects The Haunted Boy, The Abyssal Plain #1–2, The Devil Does Not Jest #1–2.
 Abe Sapien Volume 3: The Dark and Terrible and the New Race of Man (December 2013) – Collects The Dark and Terrible #1–3, The New Race of Man #1–2.
 Abe Sapien Volume 4: The Shape of Things To Come (July 2014) – Collects The Shape of Things to Come #1–2 and To The Last Man #1–3.
 Abe Sapien Volume 5: Sacred Place (January 2015) – Collects The Garden (one-shot), The Healer (one-shot), Visions, Dreams, and Fishin' (one-shot) and Sacred Places #1–2.
 Abe Sapien Volume 6: A Darkness So Great (July 2015) – Collects A Darkness So Great #1–5.
 Abe Sapien Volume 7: The Secret Fire (June 2016) – Collects Abe Sapien  #24–#26, #28–#29, #31.
 Abe Sapien Volume 8: The Desolate Shore (January 2017) – Collects Abe Sapien  #32–#36.
 Abe Sapien Volume 9: Lost Lives and Other Stories (June 2017) – Collects Abe Sapien  8, #15, #23, #27, and #30 and Abe Sapien: Subconscious from Dark Horse Presents (volume 3) #11.

Abe Sapien omnibus editions
Abe Sapien hardcover omnibus editions collecting multiple trade paperbacks.

 Abe Sapien: Dark and Terrible, Volume 1 (November 2017) – Collects Dark and Terrible and The New Race of Man, The Shape of Things to Come, and Sacred Places.
 Abe Sapien: Dark and Terrible, Volume 2 (March 2018) – Collects A Darkness so Great, The Secret Fire, and The Desolate Shore.
 Abe Sapien: The Drowning and Other Stories (July 2018) – Collects The Drowning, The Devil Does Not Jest and Other Stories, and Lost Lives and Other Stories.

Lobster Johnson trade paperbacks
 Lobster Johnson Volume 1: The Iron Prometheus (June 2008) – Collects The Iron Prometheus #1–5, sketchbook, "The Secret History of Lobster Johnson" feature.
 Lobster Johnson Volume 2: The Burning Hand (November 2012) – Collects The Burning Hand #1–5.
 Lobster Johnson Volume 3: Satan Smells A Rat (February 2014) – Collects The Prayer of Neferu", "Caput Mortuum", "Satan Smells A Rat", "A Scent of Lotus #1–2, Tony Masso's Finest Hour.
 Lobster Johnson Volume 4: Get The Lobster (December 2014) – Collects Get The Lobster #1–5.
 Lobster Johnson Volume 5: The Pirate's Ghost and Metal Monsters of Midtown (December 2017) – Collects Metal Monsters of Midtown #1–3, The Pirate's Ghost #1–3.
 Lobster Johnson Volume 6: A Chain Forged in Life (March 2018) – Collects A Chain Forged In Life, The Glass Mantis, The Forgotten Man, Garden of Bones, Mangekyō.

Lobster Johnson omnibus editions
Lobster Johnson hardcover omnibus editions collecting multiple trade paperbacks.

 Lobster Johnson, Volume 1 (February 2022) – Collects The Burning Hand, Satan Smells A Rat, Get The Lobster.

Sir Edward Grey: Witchfinder trade paperbacks
 Sir Edward Grey: Witchfinder Volume 1: In the Service of Angels (April 2010) – Collects In the Service of Angels #1–5, Murderous Intent, The Burial of Katharine Baker, sketchbook.
 Sir Edward Grey: Witchfinder Volume 2: Lost and Gone Forever (January 2012) – Collects Lost and Gone Forever #1–5, sketchbook.
 Sir Edward Grey: Witchfinder Volume 3: The Mysteries of Unland (April 2015) – Collects he Mysteries of Unland #1–5, sketchbook.
 Sir Edward Grey: Witchfinder Volume 4: City of the Dead (April 2017) – Collects City of the Dead  #1–5, sketchbook.
 Sir Edward Grey: Witchfinder Volume 5: The Gates of Heaven (January 2019) – Collects The Gates of Heaven #1-5.
 Sir Edward Grey: Witchfinder Volume 6: The Reign of Darkness (September 2020) – Collects The Reign of Darkness #1-5.

Sir Edward Grey: Witchfinder omnibus editions
Witchfinder hardcover omnibus editions collecting multiple trade paperbacks.

 Sir Edward Grey: Witchfinder, Volume 1 (November 2019) – Collects In the Service of Angels, Lost and Gone Forever, The Mysteries of Unland.
 Sir Edward Grey: Witchfinder, Volume 2 (November 2021) – Collects City of the Dead, The Gates of Heaven, The Reign of Darkness.

Hellboy Universe Essentials
In October 2020 Dark Horse Comics announced a new line of trade paperbacks called Hellboy Universe Essentials. Each volume will center around an existing publishing line and contain the most important stories of that line. These books are designed for casual readers that wish to read the comics without having to worry about the broader continuity and ongoing plotlines.

 Hellboy Universe Essentials: Hellboy (July 2021) – Collects The Chained Coffin, The Third Wish, Pancakes, The Nature of the Beast, The Corpse, The Baba Yaga, A Christmas Underground, The Ghoul, and The Troll Witch.
 Hellboy Universe Essentials: B.P.R.D. (November 2021) – Collects Plague of Frogs.
 Hellboy Universe Essentials: Lobster Johnson (March 2022) – Collects The Burning Hand.
 Hellboy Universe Essentials: Witchfinder (July 2022).

Other canon trade paperbacks
Canonical stories written by Mike Mignola that are part of the overall plot.

 Sledgehammer 44 (May 2014) – Collects Sledgehammer 44 #1–2, Lightning War #1–3.
 Frankenstein Underground (November 2015) – Collects Frankenstein Underground #1–5.
 Rise of the Black Flame (May 2017) – Collects Rise of the Black Flame #1–5.
 The Visitor: How & Why He Stayed (October 2017) – Collects The Visitor: How & Why He Stayed #1–5 and God Rest Ye Merry from Hellboy Winter Special 2017.
 Rasputin: The Voice of the Dragon (July 2018) – Collects Rasputin: The Voice of the Dragon #1-5.
 Koshchei the Deathless (September 2018) – Collects Koshchei the Deathless #1-6.
 Crimson Lotus (July 2019) – Collects Crimson Lotus #1-5.
 House of Lost Horizons: A Sarah Jewell Mystery (February 2022) – Collects The House of Lost Horizons #1-5 and The Longest Night.
 The Sword of Hyperborea (August 2022) – Collects The Sword of Hyperborea #1-4.

Other canon omnibus editions
 Hellboy Universe: The Secret Histories (June 2021) – Collects Rasputin: The Voice of the Dragon, Sledgehammer 44, The Visitor: How and Why He Stayed.

Other non-canon trade paperbacks
Non-canonical stories written by various writers.

 Hellboy Sourcebook and Roleplaying Game (August 2002)  –  GURPS role-playing game sourcebook including two short comics: The Kabandha and The Astromagnet.
 Hellboy: Weird Tales Volume 1 (December 2003) – Collects Hellboy: Weird Tales #1–4, sketchbook, art gallery.
 Hellboy Junior (January 2004) – Collects Hellboy Junior #1–2, Hellboy Junior Halloween Special, sketchbook, "Hellboy Jr. vs. Hitler".
 Hellboy: Weird Tales Volume 2 (October 2004) – Collects Hellboy: Weird Tales #5–8, sketchbook, art gallery.
 Hellboy Animated: The Black Wedding (January 2007) – The first in a trilogy based in the Hellboy Animated universe.
 Hellboy Animated: Judgment Bell (June 2007) – The second in a trilogy based in the Hellboy Animated universe.
 Hellboy Animated: The Menagerie (December 2007) – The third in a trilogy based in the Hellboy Animated universe.
 Itty Bitty Hellboy (April 2014) – Collects Itty Bitty Hellboy #1–5.
 Hellboy: Weird Tales Hardcover (November 2014) – Collects Hellboy: Weird Tales #1–8, "How Koshchei Became Deathless" back-up serial from Hellboy: The Wild Hunt #2–3, and "Baba Yaga's Feast" back-up from Hellboy: The Wild Hunt #4.
 Itty Bitty Hellboy: The Search for the Were-Jaguar! (May 2016) – Collects Itty Bitty Hellboy: The Search for the Were-Jaguar #1-4.

Other crossovers
Mike Mignola's creation has starred in many other artists' comics.

 Next Men, Volume 4: Faith (February 1995) – Collects Next Men #19–22. Issue #21 contains the first appearance of Hellboy.
 Gen¹³: #13 A-B-C Collected Edition (Image Comics & WildStorm, November 1997) – Collects Gen¹³ #13A-13C. Issue #13C includes a guest appearance by Hellboy.
 Sin City: Hell and Back (December 2000) – Collects Hell and Back (A Sin City Love Story) #1–9. Issue #7 features an appearance by Hellboy in a hallucination.
 Savage Dragon/Hellboy (Image Comics, 2002) – Collects Savage Dragon #34–35, with cover and pin-up gallery.
 Savage Dragon, Volume 9: Worlds at War (Image Comics, November 2003) – Collects Savage Dragon #41–46. Issue #41 has a cameo by Hellboy.
 Savage Dragon, Volume 10: End Game (Image Comics, February 2004) – Collects Savage Dragon #47–52. Issue #51 has a cameo by Hellboy.
 Goon, Volume 3: Heaps of Ruination (February 2005) – Collects The Goon #5–8. Issue #7 contains a Goon/Hellboy crossover.
 Madman, Volume 2 (Image Comics, October 2007) – Collects Madman Comics #1–11. Issue #5 contains a major cameo by Hellboy.
 The Heretic (IDW Publishing, November 2008) – Collects The Heretic #1–4. Issue #4 contains a cameo by Hellboy and Abe Sapien.
 Danger Unlimited (IDW Publishing, March 2009) – Collects Danger Unlimited #1–4, Babe #1–4, Babe 2 #1–2. Babe 2 contains a major cameo by Abe Sapien and Danger Unlimited #4 features a Hellboy cameo.
 Body Bags: Father's Day (Image Comics, June 2009) – Collects Body Bags #1–2. Issue #1 contains a brief cameo by Hellboy and Abe Sapien in disguise.
 Hellboy: Masks and Monsters (October 2010) – Collects Ghost/Hellboy Special #1–2, Batman/Hellboy/Starman #1–2.
 Criminal Macabre Omnibus Vol. 3 (June 2015) - Includes Criminal Macabre / The Goon: When Freaks Collide, which contains a Hellboy cameo.
 Archie vs. Predator Hardcover (November 2015) – Collects Archie vs. Predator #1–4. Issue #1 includes the back-up story "Sabrina Meets Hellboy".
 Beasts of Burden: Neighborhood Watch Hardcover (September 2019) - Includes Hellboy/Beasts of Burden: Sacrifice.

Chronological list of uncollected comic books
Some stories have not yet been collected into trade paperback volumes.

Shi/Cyblade: The Battle For Independents Contains a small cameo from Hellboy. (September 1995)
Painkiller Jane/Hellboy One-shot crossover with Painkiller Jane. (August 1998)
The Astromagnet Short comic made to promote the Hellboy RPG.
Hellboy Animated: Phantom Limbs This was included with the Hellboy Animated: Sword of Storms DVD. (October 2006)
Hellboy Animated: The Yearning This was included with the Hellboy Animated: Blood and Iron DVD. (May 2007)
Hellboy: The Golden Army Hellboy: The Golden Army is a 16-page comic that details the rise of the Golden Army. It was given out at WonderCon. (January 2008)
3-D Cowboy's Cosmic Convict Challenge(rs) Hellboy appears in this comic only available at the Challengers Comics + Conversation comic book store in Chicago. (May 2016)
Fearless Dawn Meets Hellboy (September 2020)

References

External links
Official site

Hellboy at Dark Horse Comics

 
Hellboy